Chengda may refer to:

 Fan Chengda (1126-1193), Song Dynasty Chinese poet
 Liaoning Chengda, the state-owned company in Dalian, Liaoning, China